William C. Lickle (born August 2, 1929 in Wilmington, Delaware is a retired American banker and steeplechase owner.

Early life 
Lickle studied at the University of Virginia and graduated in 1951 BA, and 1953 JJD.

Banking 
He is a former chairman and CEO of Laird Bissell & Meeds (NYSE), the Delaware Trust Company and Chairman of J.P. Morgan International Holdings Corporation. He was also a Director of Dean Witter and President of Lickle Publishing. In 1988, he was appointed by President Ronald Reagan to the President's Export Council. He a Member of the American, Virginia and Supreme Court bars

Steeplechase owner 
As a steeplechase owner, Lickle was (upon his retirement in 2005) the second Leading National Steeplechase Association (NSA)
owner in history in terms of prize money with $3,151,921 in winnings. He was a three-time leading annual National Steeplechase Association owner, in 1991, 1992 and 1997. His silks and trophies can be found in the National Museum of Racing and Hall of Fame in Saratoga, New York and in the Steeplechase Hall of Fame in Camden, South Carolina.

Recognition 
 Eclipse Award, 1996, Correggio
 Second Leading National Steeplechase Association (NSA) owner in history, $3,151,921
 Three-time leading annual NSA owner: 1991, 1992, 1997
 Three-time Iroquois winners: 1991, 1992, 1997
 Two-time Colonial Cup winners: 1990, 1996

Champion Horses 
 Victorian Hill (all-time leading Steeplechase horse in earnings of $748,370; four course records
 Correggio (Eclipse Award winner); earnings of $258,880
 Hudson Bay (Saratoga track record); earnings of $232,685
 Master McGraw (Smithwick, Temple, Gwathmey Carolina Cup; earnings of $331,355)
 Trebizond (Triple Crown: Keeneland, Belmont, with Pimlico cancelled; earnings $223,088)
 Green highlander (Novice champion; Saratoga flat track record; earnings of $270,393)
 Young Dubliner (National Timber Champion; Maryland Hunt Cup and Penn Hunt Cup winner)
 Where's Pepo (National Timber Champion)
 Sinatra (Queen Elizabeth II Challenge Cup and Grade I Test Stake; earnings of $378,606)
 Tide (Budweiser Breeder's Cup; earnings of $234,006)

References

External links 
 

American bankers